Musa bin Mohamad (Jawi: موسى بن محمد) was one of the members of the UMNO Supreme Council between 2000 and 2003. He is also the former Minister of Education and former Vice-Chancellor, Universiti Sains Malaysia.

Education
He received Bachelor of Pharmacy in University of Singapore in 1962 and Master of Science Degree in Pharmaceutical Technology from University of London in 1972.

Career
He has experience for more than 20 years in teaching and academic administration at Universiti Sains Malaysia. He was then, the Foundation Dean for Pharmacy of Universiti Sains Malaysia (USM) from 1975 to 1979. He was also the Deputy Vice Chancellor (Academic) before made as Vice Chancellor from 1982 to 1998.

Politics
He was appointed as a Senator in 1999 by Prime Minister of Malaysia, Tun Dr. Mahathir Mohamad. He then, appointed as Minister of Education from 1999 to 2003. Tun Abdullah Ahmad Badawi extend his ministerial position until 2004.

Upon retirement
After retirement from the government, he was appointed as Chairman for several corporations such as Polyglass, Universiti Telekom Sdn Bhd (also as the director).  He was also the Independent & Non-Executive Chairman of Pelikan International Corporation Berhad from 2005 to 2012.

Awards
He was awarded 7 honorary doctorates in science by the University College of Science and Technology (KUSTEM), University Malaysia Sabah (UMS), North Malaysia Engineering University College (KUKUM), Science University of Malaysia (USM); in knowledge science by Multimedia University (MMU); in philosophy by University College Tun Hussein Onn (KUITTHO); and education by UCSI University. Tan Sri Musa is also a fellow of the Malaysian Pharmaceutical Society and the Academy of Sciences.

Honour of Malaysia
  : 
 Companion of the Order of Loyalty to the Crown of Malaysia (JSM)
 Commander of the Order of Loyalty to the Crown of Malaysia (PSM) - Tan Sri (1994)
 :
 Companion of the Order of the Defender of State - Dato’ (DMPN)
 :
 Knight of the Order of Cura Si Manja Kini (DPCM) - Dato’ (1985)
 Knight Grand Commander of the Order of the Perak State Crown (SPMP) - Dato’ Seri (2000)

References

1943 births
Living people
Commanders of the Order of Loyalty to the Crown of Malaysia
United Malays National Organisation politicians
Government ministers of Malaysia
Members of the Dewan Negara
Education ministers of Malaysia
Companions of the Order of Loyalty to the Crown of Malaysia